The Speewa Ferry is a cable ferry across the Murray River on the border between the Australian states of New South Wales and Victoria.

The ferry is controlled by Transport for NSW, but is jointly funded by both states. It operates seven days a week, carries a maximum of three cars at a time, and is free of tolls. The times of operation vary on different days of the week, but the ferry operates from 0800 to 2100 on all days, and longer on some. On each day there are two one-hour breaks in service.

However, there are another 11 such ferries further downstream, on the South Australia section of the river.

See also
Murray River crossings

References

External links

 RMS vehicle ferry operation information.
 RMS heritage information on Speewa Ferry

Cable ferries in Australia
Crossings of the Murray River
Ferries of New South Wales